Neuburg or Neue Burg can refer to:

Places 
 Hofburg, the former principal imperial palace of the Habsburg dynasty located in the centre of Vienna
 Klosterneuburg, a town in Lower Austria
 Neuburg Air Base, an air base in Neuburg an der Donau, Germany
 Neuburg an der Donau, a town in the state of Bavaria, Germany
 Neuburg an der Kammel, a town in the district of Günzburg, Bavaria, Germany
 Neuburg (Freiburg im Breisgau), a quarter of Freiburg, Baden-Württemberg, Germany
 Neuburg am Inn, a town in the district of Passau, Bavaria, Germany
 Neuburg-Schrobenhausen, a district in the state of Bavaria in Germany
 Neuburg am Rhein, a municipality in the district of Germersheim, Rhineland-Palatinate, Germany
 Palatinate-Neuburg, a historic state of the Holy Roman Empire
 Neuburg, Mecklenburg-Vorpommern, a town in Mecklenburg-Vorpommern in Germany
 Neuburg (Winterthur), a quarter in Winterthur, Switzerland
 Neuburg Abbey, now a Benedictine monastery near Heidelberg, Rhineland-Palatinate, Germany
 Neue Burg (Hamburg), a medieval saxonian castle in the town of Hamburg

Surname 

 Hans Neuburg, Swiss designer and art critic
Victor Benjamin Neuburg, British Writer